Ziziphus talanae, the balakat, aligamen, or talanai, is a species of tree in the family Rhamnaceae.

Distribution
Ziziphus talanae is endemic to Luzon and Visayas, in the Philippines,  The tree is found in the Philippinean Limestone Forest ecoregion.

Uses
In Antique Province, its bark is used medicinally for diseases from ringworm to urinary tract infections. Studies have shown that the bark does have antimicrobial properties.

The city of Mabalacat in Pampanga Province was named after it in 1712, using the indigenous Negrito word mabalacat meaning "forest of balakat."

References

talanae
Endemic flora of the Philippines
Flora of Luzon
Flora of the Visayas
Trees of the Philippines
Vulnerable plants
Taxonomy articles created by Polbot